Florence Ngala also known as Flo, is an American street, celebrity, portrait photographer and photojournalist from Harlem, NY. She has been featured in Vogue, Essence, Forbes, GQ, Ebony and Amsterdam News. Ngala's coverage on Figure Skating in Harlem (FSH) landed her the cover of The New York Times. As a celebrity photographer, she has captured many stars such as Cardi B, Gucci Mane, Remy Ma and Megan Thee Stallion. Flo has shot for Rolling Stone and has a client list that includes Nike, Reebok, Revlon and WWD.

Career
Ngala's foray into photography started at the young age of 14. She began with self-portraits, which she credits as her ability to shoot her subjects. Working as the personal photographer for Gucci Mane helped to expand Flo's portfolio, and ultimately create opportunities for her career to blossom. Ngala went on to become Cardi B's personal photographer, capturing her at the BET Hip Hop Awards, the Met Gala and her various projects. Ngala's range is wide, from politician Stacey Abrams, whom she shot for Rolling Stone, to Sarah Jessica Parker for Footwear News. In 2019 Ngala would have her photograph grace the cover of the New York Times, a momentous milestone in her career. In the Times article titled ‘When I Skate It Just Feels Free’ Flo's B&W shots of FSH skaters were on full display.

Exhibition

Harlem Ice: The Selects Folder
In 2019 Ngala had her first Gallery Exhibit at Compère Collective Gallery in Red Hook, Brooklyn.  As an FSH Alumna, Ngala spent over a decade with Figure Skating in Harlem. These roots allowed her to capture the images for her exhibit which featured 20 of Ngala's images of the FSH skaters, much of which were shot while on the ice with them. Ngala credits FSH with building her foundation, a foundation which her photography was built on. She believes expressing emotions through art—play, diligence, commitment, and focus have played a role in her career as a photographer.

Personal life
Ngala was born and raised in Harlem, NY. She is of Nigerian–Cameroonian decent. Her mother is Nigerian and her father is Cameroonian. She attended the Horace Mann School. Ngala's parents immigrated from West Africa in 1992. Ngala has three siblings.

References 

Living people
American photojournalists
Year of birth missing (living people)
Women photojournalists